Catherine or Katherine Burke may refer to:

Catherine 'Katie' Burke, character in Abandon (film)
Kathy Burke or Katherine Burke (born 1964), British actress
Katherine Delmar Burke, school, named after its founder
Katharine Alice Burke (1875–1924), British chemist